Delphine Cascarino (born 5 February 1997) is a French professional footballer who plays as a midfielder for Division 1 Féminine club Lyon and the France national team.

Club career 
Cascarino started playing football for her local youth teams of A.S. St. Priest and A.S. A.S. Manissieux St Priest before joining Olympique Lyonnais in 2009. She made her senior debut for Lyon in the Division 1 Féminine in the 2014–15 season. She was rewarded with her first professional contract in 2015.  In January 2017, her season was ended early due to a knee injury. By 2018, she had won three UEFA Women's Champions League and three Division 1 titles with Olympic Lyonnais.

International career 
In 2012, Cascarino was selected to play for the France women's national under-17 football team, where she was part of their 2012 FIFA U-17 Women's World Cup winning campaign. Her captain Sandie Toletti said of Cascarino: "It's a great discovery, knowing that she was not part of the last European championship. She is already a great player, despite her young age." In 2016, Cascarino made her senior debut for France against the England women's national football team.

Personal life 
Cascarino is the twin sister of Estelle Cascarino, also a football player, who played alongside her sister at Lyon before moving to Paris FC in 2016. They are not related to Tony Cascarino, although they are often asked if they are: "I am often asked if I am from his family, that is not the case... I know that he notably played for Nancy and that he is Irish. Me, I'm not Irish at all! (laughs)" Her father is Italian and her mother comes from Guadeloupe.

Career statistics 
Scores and results list France's goal tally first, score column indicates score after each Cascarino goal.

Honours 
Olympique Lyonnais
 Trophée des Championnes: 2019
Division 1 Féminine: 2015–16, 2016–17, 2017–18, 2018–19,  2019–20
Coupe de France:  2018–19, 2019–20
UEFA Women's Champions League: 2015–16, 2016–17, 2017–18, 2018–19,  2019–20

Individual
 FIFA FIFPro Women's World11: 2020
 IFFHS Women's World Team: 2020
 2020 UEFA Women's Champions League Final Player of the Match

References

External links
 
 
 
 
 
 Lyon player profile 

1997 births
Living people
French women's footballers
Women's association football midfielders
Olympique Lyonnais Féminin players
Division 1 Féminine players
France women's youth international footballers
France women's international footballers
French people of Guadeloupean descent
French sportspeople of Italian descent
Black French sportspeople
2019 FIFA Women's World Cup players
Twin sportspeople
French twins
UEFA Women's Euro 2022 players